The total solar eclipse of October 7, 2135 will successively be seen in the following 23 countries:

11 European countries : Scotland, England, Netherlands, Germany, Poland, Czech Republic, Slovakia, Hungary, Ukraine, Romania and Moldova
12 Asian countries : Turkey, Syria, Iraq, Iran, Kuwait, Qatar, UAE, Saudi Arabia, Oman, Maldives, Indonesia and East Malaysia.

Length

Maximum 

The point of maximum totality is located in Oman between the cities of Al Khaluf and Duqm and lasts 4m49,4s.

Limitations

Related eclipses

References

External links 

 Fred Espenak, Eclipse expert at NASA
 Google Map of this event, by NASA

2135 10 07
2135 10 07
22nd century in science
2135 10 07
2130s